Osceola Township is one of eleven townships in Camden County, Missouri, USA.  As of the 2000 census, its population was 3,457.

Geography
According to the United States Census Bureau, Osceola Township covers an area of 32.13 square miles (83.23 square kilometers); of this, 25.71 square miles (66.6 square kilometers, 80.02 percent) is land and 6.42 square miles (16.63 square kilometers, 19.98 percent) is water.

Cities, towns, villages
 Camdenton (partial)

Adjacent townships
 Jasper Township (north)
 Osage Township (northeast)
 Kiheka Township (east)
 Niangua Township (southwest)
 Adair Township (northwest)

Cemeteries
The township contains Memorial Cemetery.

Major highways
  U.S. Route 54
  Missouri Route 5

School districts
 Camdenton R-Iii School District

Political districts
 Missouri's 4th congressional district
 State House District 155
 State Senate District 33

References
 United States Census Bureau 2008 TIGER/Line Shapefiles
 United States Board on Geographic Names (GNIS)
 United States National Atlas

External links
 US-Counties.com
 City-Data.com

Townships in Camden County, Missouri
Townships in Missouri